The Hargeisa International Book Fair (HIBF) is an annual cultural event in the republic of  Somaliland. It is one of the largest public book fairs in the Horn of Africa. Every summer, HIBF brings writers, poets, artists and thinkers from Somaliland and from all over the world gather to share and discuss their art and literary productions with a wider audience. The main goal of the festival is to promote a culture of reading and writing in the region by producing and publishing high quality Somali literature and translating international classical literature (including fiction, poetry and drama) into Somali. Organized by the Redsea Online Culture Foundation, the event aims to enable young people to access a range of cultural heritages, with the intention of stimulating the revival of all forms of art and human expression, including painting, poetry reciting, story-telling, drama composition and writing.

History

Origins
The Hargeisa International Book Fair was inaugurated in 2008 by Jama Musse Jama, who serves as Director. It grew from 200 to 10,000 participants over the following six years.

Significance
HIBF targets not only a young audience, but wider sectors of society. It aims to help foster cultural understanding, tolerance, democracy, and an appreciation of the diversity of Somali culture and literature. In the past few years, the Redsea Online Culture Foundation's festivals have served to raise the profile of reading and writing in the Somaliland region, and also unite youth from different provinces in the area. The main goal of the book fair is to promote critically thinking cultural and creative writing, to facilitate the habit of reading, to display books, from both local and writers abroad, to encourage members in the public to browse, read, engage with authors, serve as an inspiration to young people, and the wider society.

Parallel events and joint ventures
Somaliland Moving Library: The Moving Library Tour is the Book Fair's flagship outreach event. An exciting initiative, it takes place a week before the opening of the festival in Hargeisa and is held across all regions of Somaliland. It aims to bring the ethos and principles of the Book Fair – of citizenship and creative freedoms – closer to aspiring writers and readers outside of the city.

Guests of honour and themes

See also
Somalian literature

Notes

References
Letter from Somaliland
The Somaliland book fair: A haven of jollity and calm
Financial Times Reporting Back by Kathrine  Manson
In Pictures: somaliland goes crazy with Books
UKinSomalia at the opening

External links

Programme 2010
Programme 2014
Programme 2015

Book fairs in Somalia